Plagiopholis is a genus of snakes in the family Colubridae. The genus is native to Asia.

General Facts
The species of the genus Plagiopholis are found in Southeast Asia, China and Taiwan. The snakes of this genus are mountainous species that can be found in grasses and bushes. They feed primarily on earthworms, frogs, and arthropods (Zhao 2006). All species are oviparous, meaning they use internal fertilization to lay eggs. Plagiopholis species can be distinguished from other genera in the subfamily Pseudoxenodontinae by their lower midbody scale count, entire anal plate, and smaller size (O'Shea 2018).

List of species
 Plagiopholis blakewayi  – Blakeway's mountain snake
 Plagiopholis delacouri 
 Plagiopholis nuchalis  – Assam mountain snake
 Plagiopholis styani  – Chinese mountain snake

Nota bene: A binomial authority in parentheses indicates that the species was originally described in a genus other than Plagiopholis.

Etymology
The specific name, blakewayi, is in honor of a Lieutenant Blakeway who resigned from the British army and collected reptiles in what is now Myanmar.

The specific name, delacouri, is in honor of French-born American ornithologist Jean Théodore Delacour.

Original publication
Boulenger GA (1893). Catalogue of the Snakes in the British Museum (Natural History). Volume I., Containing the Families ... Colubridæ Aglyphæ, part. London: Trustees of the British Museum (Natural History). (Taylor and Francis, printers). xiii + 448 pp. + Plates I-XXVIII. (Plagiopholis, new genus, p. 301).().

References

Further reading
 Zhong GH, De Chen W, Liu Q, Zhu F, Peng P, Guo P (2015). "Valid or not?  Yunnan mountain snake Plagiopholis unipostocularis (Serpentes: Colubridae: Pseudoxenodontinae)". Zootaxa 4020 (2): 390-396.
 O'Shea M (2018). The Book of Snakes: A life-size guide to six hundred species from around the world. University of Chicago Press.

 
Snake genera
Taxa named by George Albert Boulenger